Howard Leslie "Krug" Crawford (1892–1959) was a reporter and a news, sports, and managing editor for the Brandon Sun from 1919 until his death in 1959.  He is an "Honoured Member" of the Manitoba Hockey Hall of Fame.

References

Canadian sportswriters
1892 births
1959 deaths